Sir James Harwood Harrison, 1st Baronet (6 June 1907 – 11 September 1980) was a British Conservative Party politician. He was the Member of Parliament (MP) for the constituency of Eye in Suffolk from 1951 to 1979, having first contested it in 1950.

Harrison was the eldest son of the Rev'd E W Harrison and E E Tribe of Bugbrooke, Northamptonshire where his family had owned land since the eighteenth century. The family home, Bugbrooke Hall, is now owned by the Jesus Army. He was educated at Northampton Grammar School and Trinity College, Oxford and worked as a company director for a feeding-stuffs manufacturer. He served as an Ipswich Borough Councillor from 1935 to 1946 and served during World War II with The Suffolk Regiment, commanding the 4th Battalion. He was taken prisoner in Singapore and spent time on the Burma Railway.

Harrison won Eye at the 1951 general election, defeating Edgar Granville. He was Harold Macmillan's Parliamentary Private Secretary when Macmillan was Housing Secretary. He served as a Government Whip as a Lord of the Treasury from 8 April 1956 to 16 January 1959, and Comptroller of the Household between 1959 and 1961. He subsequently chaired backbench Conservative committees. He was created a Baronet on 6 July 1961.

On his retirement as MP for Eye at the 1979 general election, the seat was contested by another Conservative, John Gummer, elected with a majority of 27%. The seat was abolished at 1983 general election and was divided up into the three new seats: Suffolk Coastal, Central Suffolk and Waveney, all of which returned Conservative candidates. Gummer was elected Member of Parliament for Suffolk Coastal, Michael Lord for Central Suffolk and James Prior for Waveney.

He married Peggy Stenhouse, daughter of Lt Col V D Stenhouse in 1932 and had two children, Sir Michael James Harwood Harrison, 2nd Baronet, and Joanna Kathleen Sanders.

He is buried in the churchyard of St Michael and All Angels', Bugbrooke, Northamptonshire.

References

External links 
 

Conservative Party (UK) MPs for English constituencies
1907 births
1980 deaths
Alumni of Trinity College, Oxford
Baronets in the Baronetage of the United Kingdom
British Army personnel of World War II
Burma Railway prisoners
Councillors in Suffolk
Ministers in the Eden government, 1955–1957
Ministers in the Macmillan and Douglas-Home governments, 1957–1964
People from Bugbrooke
Suffolk Regiment officers
UK MPs 1951–1955
UK MPs 1955–1959
UK MPs 1959–1964
UK MPs 1964–1966
UK MPs 1966–1970
UK MPs 1970–1974
UK MPs 1974
UK MPs 1974–1979
World War II prisoners of war held by Japan
Military personnel from Northamptonshire
[[Category:British World War II prisoners of war][